Minsk Province may refer to:
 Minsk Region, oblast of Belarus
 Minsk Governorate of the Russian Empire (1793–1921)